Tinoco is a surname. Notable people with the surname include:

Agustín Cruz Tinoco, Mexican wood carver
Alfredo Tinoco (born 1934), Mexican middle-distance runner
Alfredo Alves Tinoco (1904–1975), Brazilian football player
Francisco Márquez Tinoco (born 1960), Mexican politician
Gerson Tinoco (born 1988), Guatemalan football player
Jesús Tinoco (born 1995), Venezuelan baseball player
José Tinoco (born 1974), Guatemalan sprinter
Luís Tinoco
Luís Tinoco (composer), Portuguese composer
Luís Tinoco (footballer) (born 1986), Portuguese footballer
Marcos Tinoco, Brazilian football manager
María Fernández de Tinoco (1877–1961), Costa Rican writer
Pedro Tinoco (c. 1928–1993), Venezuelan businessman and politician
Pedro Nunes Tinoco (d. 1641), Portuguese architect
Rodolfo Aguirre Tinoco (born 1927), Mexican artist
Santos Velázquez y Tinoco (d. 1846), Costa Rican politician
Tania Tinoco (born 1963), Ecuadorian journalist, author, producer